John James Webster (9 June 1845 – 1914) was an English civil engineer who specialised in designing bridges.

He was born in Warrington, Lancashire and educated at Owens College, Manchester. He trained with Bellhouse & Co of Manchester, where he became chief draughtsman.

In 1871 he moved to Ashbury Carriage & Iron Co, where he designed several bridges in India, which led to his appointment as Chief of the Bridge Department of Messrs Thos. Brassey & Co., for whom he was responsible for the construction of the Liverpool landing-stage. In 1876 he worked for a short time as assistant engineer to the Aberdeen Harbour Works before joining the Hull Dock Company as assistant engineer.

In 1881 he set up in business as a consultant, firstly in Liverpool and then in London. Some of his more notable structures included:
 the reconstruction of the Conway Suspension Bridge
 Portsmouth bascule bridge
 Littlehampton swing bridge
 Widnes-Runcorn Transporter Bridge
 Shepherd's Bush Stadium for the Olympic Games of 1908
 Big Wheel at Earl's Court
 piers at Dover, Bangor, Minehead, Llandudno, Penmaenmawr, Menai Bridge, and Egremont

He was a member of the Institution of Civil Engineers and was awarded their Telford Gold Medal. His last work was Warrington Bridge at Bridgefoot which was one of the earliest examples of a reinforced concrete bridge.

He died at 81 Mount Nod Road, in Streatham on 30 October 1914 and was buried at West Norwood Cemetery.

References and notes
Notes

Citations

1845 births
1914 deaths
People from Warrington
English engineers
Burials at West Norwood Cemetery